Saurav Vishnu is an Indian director and producer, known for his works on films like Tailing Pond and Guilty Not Guilty. Tailing pond qualified for consideration for the 93rd Academy Awards in the Documentary – Short category.

Early life 

Saurav Vishnu was born in Jharkhand, India, and moved from Jamshedpur, India to New York City in 2003.  A graduate of engineering, Saurav Vishnu pursued an MBA in finance and risk management at St. John's University.

Career
Jadugora was Saurav's first filmmaking project, as his father, Ashok Kumar Tiwary, was posted as the officer-in-charge of Jadugora police station twice. The film took 5 years to complete. A non for profit (501(c)(3) organization was formed in 2017 to raise funds for the Jadugora communities.

The documentary exposes the plight of the tribal families in the small town of Jadugora because of the tailing ponds containing mildly radioactive, unguarded waste. As per the reports "47% of women in Jadugora have reported miscarriages, disruptions in menstrual cycles, and other fertility issues. Further, 51% of the children are afflicted with limb deformities and skeletal distortions, right at birth".

This is contrary to claims made by UCIL regarding their investments in healthcare, ecology, and environmental protection, in their annual report for the session 2019-20 that also recorded income of Rs 2,420 crores/$310 million. The documentary shows the abysmal healthcare facilities, and how the only medical centre remains closed for most part of the year.

Per Vishnu, subsequent documentary films would delve deeper into the issue of tailing ponds. (UCIL has acquired new pieces of land to construct new tailing ponds).

Saurav's upcoming projects includes a crime drama titled One (writer, producer, and director). The New Me, a horror film, is in its production stage.

Filmography

 Tailing Pond (2021) (Producer & Director)
 Guilty Not Guilty (2018) (Producer)
The New Me (Post Production)

References

External links 

Living people
21st-century Indian film directors
Indian documentary filmmakers
Year of birth missing (living people)